Ortho- is a Greek prefix meaning “straight”, “upright”, “right” or “correct”.

Ortho may refer to:
 Ortho, Belgium, a village in the Belgian province of Luxembourg

In science
 arene substitution patterns, two substituents that occupy adjacent positions on an aromatic ring
 Chlordane, an organochlorine compound that was used as a pesticide

In mathematics:
 Orthogonal, a synonym for perpendicular
 Orthonormal, the property that a collection of vectors are mutually perpendicular and each of unit magnitude
 Orthodrome, a synonym for great circle, a geodesic on the sphere
 Orthographic projection, a parallel projection onto a perpendicular plane

In medicine:
 Orthomyxovirus, a family of viruses to which influenza belongs
 Orthodontics, a specialty of dentistry concerned with the study and treatment of malocclusions
 Orthopedic, the study of the musculoskeletal system
 Ortho-DOT, a psychedelic drug
 Ortho-cept and Ortho Tri-cyclen, kinds of oral contraceptive drug

In theology:
 Orthodoxy, right (correct) belief
 Orthopraxy, right (correct) action

In business:
 Ortho Pharmaceutical, which merged into Ortho-McNeil Pharmaceutical before being bought by Johnson & Johnson
 Ortho-Clinical Diagnostics, another subsidiary of Johnson & Johnson
 Ortho, a lawn care and pesticide company owned by the Scotts Miracle-Gro Company

See also
 Orthos (disambiguation)
 Ortho Mode Transducer 
 Orthochromatic 
 Orthophotography
 Orthoptera